Three Ireland (Hutchison) Limited (formerly Hutchison 3G Ireland Limited), commonly known as 3 Ireland or Three Ireland, is a telecommunications and Internet service provider operating in Ireland as a subsidiary of CK Hutchison Holdings, operating under the global Three brand. The company launched in July 2005 and provides 2G GSM, 3G UMTS, 4G LTE and 5G NR mobile phone services. Three's former holding company, Hutchison Whampoa, acquired O2 Ireland in June 2013, and the company was fully merged into the operations of Three Ireland in March 2015.

History
Three launched on 26 July 2005 as Ireland's fourth mobile network operator behind Vodafone, O2 and Meteor (now Eir). Service was initially offered as post-paid only, but on 16 May 2006 the introduction of a pre-paid service, known as 3Pay, was announced. A pre-paid mobile broadband service was launched on 29 February 2008 under the name 3Pay Broadband, with vouchers available for durations of one day, one week, or one month. On 13 May 2010, Three announced the launch of the world's first commercial voice and data I-HSPA network.

In August 2010, Three Ireland admitted it had been overstating its subscriber numbers since 2006. As per its latest released mid year statements about 56 per cent of Three's 554,000 registered subscribers are considered active. This is about 244,000 short of the figure supplied to ComReg.

On 24 June 2013, it was announced that Hutchison would acquire Telefónica's Irish mobile operations, O2 for €780 million, to be merged into Three Ireland upon completion of the deal. The European Commission approved the merger in 2014. The O2 brand was phased out and its operations fully merged into Three on 2 March 2015.

Network
Three has a licence for operation in Ireland using the access code 083, although numbers can be ported over from other networks.

Three's original infrastructure was purely 3G. For a while, they provided 2G coverage (a) under a partnership with Vodafone, and (b) through the acquisition of O2 Ireland's 2G network in 2015, however, roaming on Vodafone is no longer supported, and 2G is natively supported with the acquisition of O2 and its 3G & 2G networks.

In July 2012, Three Ireland announced a strategic partnership with Vodafone Ireland to share network infrastructure. This would have facilitated rapid rollout of Three's 4G network, while also making it less costly. The agreement was terminated following the O2 merger

4G

In November 2012, Three was awarded LTE spectrum by auction, along with the three other incumbent network operators.

On 27 January 2014, Three launched their 4G network in Dublin, Cork, Galway, Limerick, Wexford and Waterford. In March 2014, Three expanded their 4G coverage to Ashbourne, Bray, Carlow, Dunmore East, Kilkenny, Leixlip, Lusk, Rush, Skerries, Swords and Tullamore.

In March 2016, Three Ireland announced that it is now offering Free 4G for Life to all its customers. Previously, Three offered free 4G to all its customers up to a certain date at which point the company would review and possibly extend that date further.

Three's upgrade programme "the big upgrade" aimed to provide 99% 4G coverage by early 2017, although that never came to fruition, making Three's 4G network both the smallest, and also the slowest in Ireland, according to Ookla, and Rootmetrics in 2018.

4G+/LTE Advanced
Three have announced they will be rolling out 4G+ to their customers offering faster Peak Speeds of 225 Mbit/s. Three say 4G+ is already available in Dublin and will be rolled out to the rest of the country by the end of April 2016. Three are offering 4G+ to all Customers with compatible handsets. Although Three's 4G network has suffered many setbacks, largely due to the merger with O2, 4G coverage currently sits at 97.3% in March 2020.

Three was named Ireland's fastest mobile network by Ookla for Q3–Q4 2020, with an average download speed of 33.99Mbit/s.

5G
In September 2020, Three launched their new 5G network. Three has stated that this new service will be available in 121 locations but coverage is expected to expand overtime. "At Three, we believe it's important that this technology is available to all. That’s why we’ve created Ireland’s largest 5G network with coverage in 121 areas throughout the country."

Network frequencies
The following is a list of known frequencies used by Three Ireland:

Sponsorships
On 5 August 2010, Three Ireland announced a four-year, €7,500,000 deal with the Football Association of Ireland to become the primary sponsor of all Republic of Ireland international football teams. In 2015, Three renewed the sponsorship for a further five years.

Following Hutchison Whampoa's acquisition of O2 Ireland, The O2 was renamed 3Arena in 2014.

3 also sponsors the Waterford GAA teams.

See also
 3 (telecommunications)
 3Arena
 3Olympia Theatre

References

External links

 

2005 establishments in Ireland
Telecommunications companies of the Republic of Ireland
Telecommunications in the Republic of Ireland
Telecommunications companies established in 2005
3 (company)